Joseph Blackburn may refer to:
Joseph Clay Stiles Blackburn (1838–1918), Kentucky politician
SS Joe C. S. Blackburn, a Liberty ship
Joseph Blackburn (cricketer) (1852–1922), English cricketer
Joseph Blackburn (painter) (died 1787), English portrait painter
Joe Blackburn, American ice hockey goaltender

See also
Joseph Henry Blackburne (1841–1924), British chess player